Wakaf Bharu is a satellite town in Tumpat District, Kelantan, Malaysia.

Facilities
Beside the mosque and several surau, there is also a church in Wakaf Bharu. Examples of housing estates in Wakaf Bharu area are Kawasan Perumahan SBJ, Taman Sri Palas and Taman Sri Delima, 16250 Wakaf Bharu Kelantan.

Demographics
More than 90 percent at this area are Malays and Muslims. Wakaf Bharu becomes crowded on Friday because there is a well-known market called "Friday Market" near "Pasar Besar Wakaf Bharu" or Wakaf Bharu Big Market.

Education
Two primary schools called "Sekolah Kebangsaan Wakaf Bharu" and "Sekolah Sri Wakaf Bharu" and a secondary school called "Sekolah Menengah Kebangsaan Wakaf Bharu" are located here.

Transportation
The town is served by Wakaf Bharu railway station of Keretapi Tanah Melayu. Wakaf Bharu station is in fact the major disembarkation station for passengers headed towards Kota Bharu, as Kota Bharu itself has no rail service.

Towns in Kelantan
Tumpat District